Anita Østby (born 25 January 1972) was a Norwegian politician for the Liberal Party.

She served as a deputy representative to the Norwegian Parliament from Nord-Trøndelag during the terms 2005–2009.

References

1972 births
Living people
Liberal Party (Norway) politicians
Deputy members of the Storting
Women members of the Storting
21st-century Norwegian women politicians
21st-century Norwegian politicians
Place of birth missing (living people)